Pui Ching Invitational Mathematics Competition (Traditional Chinese: 培正數學邀請賽), is held yearly by Pui Ching Middle School since 2002. It was formerly named as Pui Ching Middle School Invitational Mathematics Competition for the first three years. At present, more than 130 secondary schools send teams to participate in the competition.

See also
 List of mathematics competitions
 Education in Hong Kong

External links
 Official website (in Traditional Chinese)
 Site with past papers (in Traditional Chinese and English)

Competitions in Hong Kong
Mathematics competitions
Recurring events established in 2002
2002 establishments in Hong Kong